Coneygar (sometimes as Conygar, its original spelling) is a suburb of Bridport in Dorset, England. It is also common to find its use throughout the Cotswolds and other rural areas.

The name Conygar comes from two medieval words coney meaning rabbit and garth meaning garden, indicating that the area was once a warren where rabbits were bred for food.

External links
Coneygar at Streetmap.co.uk

Bridport